Pontolis is an extinct genus of large walrus.  It contained three species, P. magnus, P. barroni, and P. kohnoi.
Like all pinnipeds, Pontolis was a heavily built amphibious carnivore. Pontolis lived along the Pacific coast of North America along what is now the western coasts of California and Oregon between 11.608 and 5.332 million years ago, during the Miocene and Pliocene.

Description 

This giant species was much larger than modern walrus, though like many other extinct walrus species, its upper canines did not develop into long tusks like those of the modern walrus.

References

Miocene pinnipeds
Mammals described in 1905
Fossil taxa described in 1905
Prehistoric pinnipeds of North America
Odobenids
Prehistoric carnivoran genera